Asura esmia is a moth of the family Erebidae first described by Charles Swinhoe in 1894. It is found in Myanmar.

References

esmia
Moths described in 1894
Moths of Asia